Lala Mulk Raj Saraf was an Indian journalist and writer, with over seventy years of a distinguished career in journalism and social service. With several firsts to his name, he is most renowned for overcoming all odds to lay the foundation of journalism in J&K, setting up the first printing press, and publishing the region's first newspaper, Ranbir. For his pioneering efforts in enabling a free press in J&K, he is known as the "Father of Journalism in Jammu and Kashmir". A freedom fighter, social reformer, and much loved public figure, he was awarded the Padma Shri in 1976. Saraf established the JDGD Saraf Trust for promoting conscientious journalism in 1985. The Trust has emerged as a highly prestigious institution in the realm of journalism. It has played a crucial role in encouraging the growth of a healthy press by periodically venerating the veterans and decorating the youngsters for their distinctive achievements in the line.

He was born on 8 April 1894 in the Samba district of the Indian state of Jammu and Kashmir to Dayanand Saraf and Jamuna Devi and graduated from the Government Gandhi Memorial Science College Jammu. He started his career as a sub-editor at the nationalist daily Bande Mataram based in Punjab, worked there for a while, and returned to Jammu in 1924 to start J&K's first newspaper Ranbir, and Rattan, one of the most successful children's magazines of the pre-independence era with subscribers from India and what is now, Pakistan.

Saraf wrote several articles and was the author of books such as Meri Pakistan Yatra, Insaniyat Abhi Zinda Hai and Nagooh-e-Ranvir. Meri Pakistan Yatra, which detailed his reminiscences of his trip to Pakistan was selected as the Book of the Year by the Jammu and Kashmir Academy of Art, Culture and Languages in 1980. His autobiographical work was published in 1967 under the title, Fifty years as a journalist. Saraf was the author of the first biography published in Dogri language, 'Sher-e-Duggar Lala Hans Raj Mahajan Jeevan Katha', who was born in hamirpur sidhar j&k, which was released in 1968. He was awarded the fourth highest Indian civilian award of Padma Shri by the Government of India in 1976.

Mulk Raj Saraf died on 21 February 1989, at the age of 94, in Mumbai at the residence of his son, Ved Rahi, a known Bollywood film personality and the director of the film, Veer Savarkar.

See also

 Ved Rahi

References

Recipients of the Padma Shri in literature & education
1894 births
1989 deaths
Kashmiri people
People from Samba district
20th-century Indian journalists
Journalists from Jammu and Kashmir
Urdu-language journalists